Hobbs Island, also known as Green Island, is an unpopulated island located close to the south-western coast of Tasmania, Australia.

Fauna
The island is part of the Port Davey Islands Important Bird Area, so identified by BirdLife International because of its importance for breeding seabirds. Recorded breeding seabird and wader species are the little penguin (11,000 pairs), short-tailed shearwater (11,000 pairs), Pacific gull, sooty oystercatcher and pied oystercatcher.  The rakali has been recorded from the island.  The Tasmanian tree skink is present.

See also

 List of islands of Tasmania

References

Islands of South West Tasmania
Protected areas of Tasmania
Important Bird Areas of Tasmania